Colin Hill (17 July 1887 – 9 June 1953) was a Scotland international rugby union player. He played as a Forward.

Rugby Union career

Amateur career

After being educated at Fettes College Hill went to St. Andrews University. Hill then played rugby union for St. Andrews University.

Provincial career

He played for the Midlands District in their match against North of Scotland District on 7 November 1908 and on 19 November 1910. The day on 7 November 1908 was particularly notable for Hill as he refereed a hockey match in the morning between Dundee High School and Madras College F.P. in Dundee's Recreation Grounds; before then playing rugby union for the Midlands District that afternoon.

He played for the combined North of Scotland District against the South of Scotland District on 10 December 1910.

He played for the Whites Trial side against the Blues Trial side on 21 January 1911, while still playing with St. Andrews University.

International career

Hill played in 2 tests for Scotland.

Military career

In the First World War he joined the 11 battalion of the Royal Scots as a captain and fought in France. He graduated to be a Lieutanent. He was awarded the Victory Medal and the British Star. He later became an army chaplain.

Religious career

Hill followed his father into the ministry, was ordained in 1920 and became a minister of the Church of Scotland. At the time of his father's death in 1922 he was a army chaplain in India. He held a post in Kilbirnie in North Ayrshire for many years. He died in the manse.

He served on the Ayrshire Education Committee for 15 years; was on the Primary promotions Board; and on the Ayrshire Educational Trust.

References

1887 births
1953 deaths
Midlands District players
North of Scotland (combined side) players
Rugby union players from Fife
Scotland international rugby union players
Scottish rugby union players
University of St Andrews RFC players
Whites Trial players
Rugby union forwards